Nicholas Morgan (born 30 October 1959) is an English former footballer who played in the Football League for Bournemouth, Bristol City, Exeter City, Portsmouth, Stoke City and West Ham United.

Morgan began his career with his local side West Ham United where he made fleeting appearances and also had time on loan at Dutch side FC Den Haag. With chances limited at West Ham, Morgan joined Portsmouth where he enjoyed to most success in his career. He spent five seasons at Fratton Park where he made 109 appearances scoring 35 goals. He joined Stoke City where he scored 26 goals in 104 games in four seasons before playing for Bristol City for four years. After scoring 29 goals in 89 games for the "Robins" he played for Bournemouth and then Exeter City and retired in 1994.

Career
Morgan was born in East Ham and started his career at his boyhood club West Ham United as an apprentice before earning a professional contract in 1978. He failed to make much of an impression at the "Hammers" and joined Portsmouth in 1983. Prior to joining Portsmouth Morgan had spent the 1981–82 season at Dutch club FC Den Haag where he played 20 times scoring six goals but they finished in 17th position and were relegated.

He did much better at "Pompey"  and in his first season with the club they gained promotion to the Second Division. In the next four seasons Portsmouth tried to gain a promotion to the First Division finishing fourth twice with Morgan scoring 16 goals in 1985–86. They claimed that promotion they wanted in 1986–87 but Morgan left for Stoke City just four matches into the season. He made a fine start to his Stoke career scoring on his debut against Hull City on 8 November 1986. He finished the 1986–87 season with 12 goals to his name. He then hit six in the following two seasons and with Stoke enduring a terrible 1989–90 season and on their way to being relegated to the Third Division, Morgan left for Bristol City in April 1989.

It proved to be a good decision by Morgan as he scored four goals in seven matches as Bristol City and Stoke City swapped league places at the end of the season. He scored 17 goals in 1990–91 as Bristol City finished in 9th position. He fell out of the first team picture in 1991–92 and 1992–93 and spent a short spell on loan at Bournemouth. He left Bristol City in August 1993 for Exeter City, where he played 12 matches scoring four goals before deciding to retire from the game.

Career statistics
Source:

A.  The "Other" column constitutes appearances and goals in the Anglo-Italian Cup, UEFA Cup Winners' Cup, FA Community Shield, Full Members Cup, Football League Trophy.

References

External links
 

English footballers
Stoke City F.C. players
West Ham United F.C. players
Portsmouth F.C. players
Bristol City F.C. players
Exeter City F.C. players
English Football League players
1959 births
Living people
Eredivisie players
Footballers from the London Borough of Newham
Expatriate footballers in the Netherlands
English expatriate footballers
Association football forwards